The Third Legislative Council of Hong Kong was the meeting of the legislative branch of the Hong Kong Special Administrative Region Government. The membership of the LegCo is based on the 2004 election. The term of the session was from 1 October 2004 to 30 September 2008, during the second half of the Tung Chee-hwa's administration until his resignation in 2005 and was replaced by Donald Tsang for the rest of the term, and also the beginning of the third term of Chief Executive after Tsang won in the 2007 Election. The Democratic Alliance for the Betterment of Hong Kong (DAB) became the largest party with 10 seats (not including the two DAB members who ran under the Hong Kong Federation of Trade Unions banner). Notable newcomers to the Legislative Council included Leung Kwok-hung, Alan Leong, Ronny Tong, Albert Cheng, and Jeffrey Lam.

Major events
 21 December 2005: The pro-democrats voted down the government's constitutional reform package on the electoral methods for the 2007 chief executive (CE) and the 2008 Legislative Council (LegCo) elections.

Major legislation

Enacted
 6 August 2006: Interception of Communications and Surveillance Bill
 19 October 2006: Smoking (Public Health) (Amendment) Bill 2005

Composition

Note: Italic represents organisations that still function but become under another affiliation.

Graphical representation of the Legislative Council

Leadership

List of members
The following table is a list of LegCo members elected on 12 September 2004 in the order of precedence..

Members who did not serve throughout the term are italicised. New members elected since the general election are noted at the bottom of the page.

Key to changes since legislative election:
a = change in party allegiance
b = by-election

By-election

 2 December 2007, Anson Chan elected and replaced Ma Lik who died on 8 August 2007.

Other changes

2004
 Bernard Chan (Insurance), Raymond Ho (Engineering), Patrick Lau Architectural, Surveying and Planning), Lui Ming-wah (Commercial), and Abraham Shek (Real Estate and Construction), the existing members of the Breakfast Group launched a political grouping called The Alliance.

2006
 Audrey Eu (Hong Kong Island), Alan Leong (Kowloon East), Ronny Tong (New Territories East and Margaret Ng (Legal) from the Article 45 Concern Group co-founded the Civic Party in March 2006 with Mandy Tam (Accountancy and Fernando Cheung (Social Welfare) joining. Audrey Eu became the first leader of the party.
 Independent Albert Chan (New Territories West) and April Fifth Action's Leung Kwok-hung co-founded the League of Social Democrats.

Committees
 Finance Committee— Chair: Emily Lau (2004—07), Tam Yiu-chung (2007–08)
 Establishment Subcommittee— Chair: Li Fung-ying
 Public Works Subcommittee— Chair: Raymond Ho
 Public Accounts Committee— Chair: Philip Wong
 Committee on Members' Interests— Chair: Sophie Leung
 House Committee— Chair: Miriam Lau 	
 Parliamentary Liaison Subcommittee— Chair: Howard Young
 Committee on Rules of Procedure— Chair: Jasper Tsang

Panels
 Panel on Administration of Justice and Legal Services— Chair: Margaret Ng
 Panel on Commerce and Industry— Chair: Sophie Leung (2004—06), Vincent Fang (2006—08)
 Panel on Constitutional Affairs— Chair: Lui Ming-wah
 Panel on Development— Chair: Lau Wong-fat
 Panel on Economic Development— Chair: James Tien (2004—06), Jeffrey Lam (2006—08)
 Panel on Education— Chair: Yeung Sum (2006—08), Jasper Tsang (2006—08)
 Panel on Environmental Affairs— Chair: Choy So-yuk (2004—06), Audrey Eu (2006—08)
 Panel on Financial Affairs— Chair: Bernard Chan (2004—06), Chan Kam-lam (2006—08)
 Panel on Food Safety and Environmental Hygiene— Chair: Fred Li (2004—06), Tommy Cheung (2006—08)
 Panel on Health Services— Chair: Andrew Cheng (2004–05), Kwok Ka-ki (2005–06), Joseph Lee (2006—07), Li Kwok-ying (2007—08)
 Panel on Home Affairs— Chair: Tommy Cheung (2004—06), Choy So-yuk (2006—08)
 Panel on Housing— Chair: Chan Kam-lam (2004—06), Lee Wing-tat (2006—08)
 Panel on Information Technology and Broadcasting— Chair: Sin Chung-kai (2004—06), Albert Cheng (2006—08)
 Panel on Manpower— Chair: Lau Chin-shek
 Panel on Public Service— Chair: Tam Yiu-chung (2004—06), Howard Young (2006—08)
 Panel on Security— Chair: James To (2004—06), Lau Kong-wah (2006—08)
 Panel on Transport— Chair: Lau Kong-wah (2004—06), Andrew Cheng (2006—08)
 Panel on Welfare Services— Chair: Chan Yuen-han (2004—05, 2006–07), Fernando Cheung (2005—06, 2007–08)

See also
 2004 Hong Kong legislative election
 2007 Hong Kong Island by-election

References

Terms of the Legislative Council of Hong Kong
2004 in Hong Kong
2005 in Hong Kong
2006 in Hong Kong
2007 in Hong Kong
2008 in Hong Kong
2004 establishments in Hong Kong
2000s disestablishments in Hong Kong